Nawwar or Nawar may refer to:
 Nawar people, a Dom ethnic minority in Syria, Lebanon, and Jordan
 Nawar Valley, a town in Himachal Pradesh, India
 Nawar, a character from the Quest for Glory series of computer games
 An acronym used in e-readiness that stands for "networking, applications, web-accessibility and readiness"
 The name of the territory of the kingdom of Urkesh